L'École secondaire catholique l'Escale is a French-Language Catholic high school located in Rockland, Ontario. It is managed by the Conseil scolaire de district catholique de l'Est ontarien.

French-language high schools in Ontario

High school?